The National Library of Tajikistan (NLT) located in Dushanbe, Tajikistan is the main library of the country, specializing in preserving cultural heritage of the peoples of the Republic of Tajikistan. While the original library state library in Dushanbe was founded in 1933 and named after Persian-Tajik author Ferdowsi, the new national library building opened in March, 2012 alongside its new official name. The new nine-story building features 15 reading halls as well as over 20 departments. Access to the library is free to any Tajik citizen with a Passport.

Collections 
The library main focus is to include works that are of national renown by the Tajik people and of international renown written by Tajik authors. The library specializes in classics such as those by Firdavsi, who the previous library was named after. The library also features a digital collection known as the "Tajikistan National Electric Library" which is free to citizens within Tajikistan.

Directors
 Jumakhan Faizalizoda  - Director
 Saidjaf'ar Safarov  - First Deputy Director
 Gadobek Mahmudov  - Deputy Director
 Salima Rajabova  - Deputy Director

References

External links

1933 establishments in the Soviet Union
Libraries established in 1933
Tajikistan
Buildings and structures in Dushanbe
Government of Tajikistan